Roar Hansen (born 28 February 1966) is a Swedish football manager in charge of Ängelholms FF in the Swedish Division 2.

After a short playing career in the lower divisions he spent 18 years combining work at a factory with coaching various small local clubs before he finally became a Superettan manager in 2008 after winning promotion with Ängelholms FF.

References

1966 births
Living people
Swedish footballers
Swedish football managers
Landskrona BoIS non-playing staff
Östers IF managers
Helsingborgs IF managers
Ängelholms FF managers
Åtvidabergs FF managers
Högaborgs BK managers
IFK Värnamo managers

Association footballers not categorized by position